The twenty-fourth series of the British television drama series Grange Hill began broadcasting on 23 January 2001, before ending on 29 March 2001 on BBC One. The series follows the lives of the staff and pupils of the eponymous school, an inner-city London comprehensive school. It consists of twenty episodes.

Cast

Pupils

Teachers

Others

Episodes

DVD release
The twenty-fourth series of Grange Hill has never been released on DVD as of 2014.

Notes

References

2001 British television seasons
Grange Hill